The following outline is provided as an overview of and topical guide to the U.S. state of Missouri:

Missouri – U.S. state named for the Missouri River, which was named after the Siouan-language tribe. The Smithsonian Bureau of American Ethnology states that Missouri means town of the large canoes. Other authorities say the original native American syllables (from which the word came) mean wooden canoe people, he of the big canoe, or river of the big canoes. Located in the Midwestern United States, the state lies on the Mississippi river, which defines its eastern border. The land that is now Missouri was acquired from France as part of the Louisiana Purchase and became known as the Missouri Territory. Part of this Territory was admitted into the union as the 24th state on August 10, 1821.

General reference 

 Names
 Common name: Missouri
 , and by many residents 
 Official name: State of Missouri
 Abbreviations and name codes
 Postal symbol:  MO
 ISO 3166-2 code:  US-MO
 Internet second-level domain:  .mo.us
 Nicknames
 Bullion State
 Cave State
 Gateway State
 Bellwether State
 Lead State
 Ozark State
 Puke State (reported in 1881)
 Sleepy State
 Show-Me State (currently used on license plates)
 Adjectival: Missouri
 Demonym: Missourian

Geography of Missouri 

Geography of Missouri
 Missouri is: a U.S. state, a federal state of the United States of America
 Location
 Northern hemisphere
 Western hemisphere
 Americas
 North America
 Anglo America
 Northern America
 United States of America
 Contiguous United States
 Central United States
 West North Central States
 Western United States
 Midwestern United States
 Population of Missouri:  5,988,927 (2010 U.S. Census)
 Area of Missouri:
 Atlas of Missouri

Places in Missouri 

 Historic places in Missouri
 National Historic Landmarks in Missouri
 National Register of Historic Places listings in Missouri
 Bridges on the National Register of Historic Places in Missouri
 National Natural Landmarks in Missouri
 National parks in Missouri: none. See also List of National Parks of the United States and List of the United States National Park System official units
 State parks in Missouri

Environment of Missouri 

 Climate of Missouri
 Protected areas in Missouri
 State forests of Missouri
 Superfund sites in Missouri
 Wildlife of Missouri
 Fauna of Missouri
 Birds of Missouri
 Mammals of Missouri
 Reptiles
 Snakes of Missouri
 Missouri Coalition for the Environment

Natural geographic features of Missouri 
 Caves of Missouri
 Islands of Missouri
 Howell Island
 Tower Rock
 Lakes of Missouri
 Big Lake
 Mud Lake
 Norfork Lake
 Mountains of Missouri
 The Ozarks
 St. Francois Mountains
 Rivers of Missouri
 Mississippi river
 Missouri river

Regions of Missouri 

 Central Missouri

Administrative divisions of Missouri 

 The 114 Counties of the State of Missouri
 Cities in Missouri
 State capital of Missouri: Jefferson City
 City nicknames in Missouri
 List of townships in Missouri

Demography of Missouri 

Demographics of Missouri

Government and politics of Missouri 

Law and government of Missouri
 Form of government: U.S. state government
 United States congressional delegations from Missouri
 Missouri State Capitol
 Elections in Missouri
 Political party strength in Missouri

Branches of the government of Missouri 

Government of Missouri

Executive branch of the government of Missouri 
Governor of Missouri
Lieutenant Governor of Missouri
 Secretary of State of Missouri
 State Treasurer of Missouri
 State departments
 Missouri Department of Transportation

Legislative branch of the government of Missouri 

 Missouri General Assembly (bicameral)
 Upper house: Missouri Senate
 Lower house: Missouri House of Representatives

Judicial branch of the government of Missouri 

Courts of Missouri
 Supreme Court of Missouri

Law and order in Missouri 

Law of Missouri
 Cannabis in Missouri
 Capital punishment in Missouri
 Individuals executed in Missouri
 Constitution of Missouri
 Crime in Missouri
 Gun laws in Missouri
 Law enforcement in Missouri
 Law enforcement agencies in Missouri
 Missouri State Police

Military in Missouri 

 Missouri Air National Guard
 Missouri Army National Guard

History of Missouri 

History of Missouri
List of battles fought in Missouri

History of Missouri, by period 

Indigenous peoples
Mississippian culture
French colony of Louisiane, 1699–1764
Treaty of Fontainebleau of 1762
Spanish (though predominantly Francophone) district of Alta Luisiana, 1764–1803
Third Treaty of San Ildefonso of 1800
French district of Haute-Louisiane, 1803
Louisiana Purchase of 1803
Unorganized U.S. territory created by the Louisiana Purchase, 1803–1804
Lewis and Clark Expedition, 1804–1806
District of Louisiana, 1804–1805
Territory of Louisiana, 1805–1812
Pike Expedition, 1806–1807
Territory of Missouri, 1812–1821
War of 1812, June 18, 1812 – March 23, 1815
Treaty of Ghent, December 24, 1814
Missouri Compromise of 1820
State of Missouri becomes 24th State admitted to the United States of America on August 10, 1821
Platte Purchase, 1836–1837
Mexican–American War, April 25, 1846 – February 2, 1848
Pony Express, 1860–1861
American Civil War, April 12, 1861 – May 13, 1865
Missouri in the American Civil War
Border state, 1861–1865
Battle of Wilson's Creek, August 10, 1861
Price's Raid, September 27 – December 2, 1864
Harry S. Truman becomes 33rd President of the United States on April 12, 1945

History of Missouri, by region 
 History of Columbia, Missouri
 History of the Kansas City metropolitan area
 History of St. Louis, Missouri
 History of the Jews in St. Louis, Missouri

History of Missouri, by subject 

 History of education in Missouri
 History of the University of Missouri
 History of slavery in Missouri

Culture of Missouri 

 Museums in Missouri
 Religion in Missouri
 The Church of Jesus Christ of Latter-day Saints in Missouri
 Episcopal Diocese of Missouri
 Scouting in Missouri
 State symbols of Missouri
 Flag of the State of Missouri 
 Great Seal of the State of Missouri

The Arts in Missouri 
 Music of Missouri

Sports in Missouri 

Sports in Missouri

Economy and infrastructure of Missouri 

Economy of Missouri
 Communications in Missouri
 Newspapers in Missouri
 Radio stations in Missouri
 Television stations in Missouri
 Health care in Missouri
 Hospitals in Missouri
 Transportation in Missouri
 Airports in Missouri

Education in Missouri 

Education in Missouri
 Schools in Missouri
 School districts in Missouri
 High schools in Missouri
 Colleges and universities in Missouri
 University of Missouri
 Missouri State University

See also

Topic overview:
Missouri

Index of Missouri-related articles

References

External links 

Missouri Government
Missouri Digital Heritage
State Historical Society of Missouri, Columbia
Missouri's African American History
Missouri State Tourism Office
Energy & Environmental Data for Missouri
USGS real-time, geographic, and other scientific resources of Missouri
U.S. Census Bureau
Missouri QuickFacts. Geographic and demographic information.
 
USDA Missouri State Facts
List of searchable databases produced by Missouri state agencies hosted by the American Library Association Government Documents Roundtable.

Missouri History, Geology, Culture
Historic Sanborn Fire Insurance Maps of Missouri
1930 Platbooks of Missouri Counties

Missouri
Missouri